Gunjan Saxena (born 1975) is an Indian Air Force (IAF) officer and former helicopter pilot. She joined the IAF in 1996 and is a 1999 Kargil War veteran. She is one of the first women to fly in a combat zone.  One of her main roles during the Kargil War was to evacuate the wounded from Kargil, transport supplies and assist in surveillance. She would go on to be part of operations to evacuate over 900 troops, both injured and deceased, from Kargil. In 2004, after serving as a pilot for eight years, her career as a helicopter pilot ended; permanent commissions for women were not available during her time.

The 2020 Bollywood film Gunjan Saxena: The Kargil Girl is inspired by her life.

Her autobiography, The Kargil Girl, was released along with the movie by Penguin Publishers, which she had co-written with author-duo Kiran Nirvan.

Early life 
Saxena was born into an Army family. Her father, Lt Col Anup Kumar Saxena and brother Lt. Col. Anshuman both served in the Indian Army. Saxena graduated with a Bachelor of Science degree in Physics from Hansraj College, University of Delhi in New Delhi.

Indian Air Force service
Saxena was one of six women who joined the Indian Air Force (IAF) as pilots in 1996. This was the fourth batch of women air force trainees for the IAF. .Saxena's first posting was in Udhampur, as part of the 132 Forward Area Control (FAC) as a flight lieutenant. 

Flying Officer Saxena was 24 years old when she flew during the Kargil War and was stationed in Srinagar. In the Kargil War, as part of Operation Vijay, apart from evacuating the wounded, she helped transport supplies to troops in the forward areas of Dras and Batalik. She also was assigned surveillance roles such as mapping enemy positions. She had to deal with makeshift landing grounds, heights of 13,000 to 18,000 feet and enemy fire. She was one of the ten pilots, based in Srinagar that flew hundreds of sorties during the war, evacuating over 900 casualties, wounded and killed Saxena was the only women in the Indian Armed Forces who flew into war zones in the Kargil War. In 2004, her career as a helicopter pilot ended after serving for eight years. Permanent commissions were not available during her time in service.

Personal life
Saxena's father Anup Saxena was a Lieutenant Colonel in Indian Army. Saxena's husband Gautam Narain, a Wing Commander is also an Indian Air Force pilot. He is the pilot of IAF Mi-17 Helicopter. He also served as an instructor at the National Defence Academy, which is the first tri-service academy in the world. The couple have a daughter.

In popular culture 
A chapter in the book Kargil Untold Stories From The War by Rachna Bisht Rawat focuses on Gunjan Saxena.

Gunjan Saxena's autobiography, titled ‘The Kargil Girl’ co-written with author-duo Kiran Nirvan, was released by Penguin Publishers along with the movie. The book garnered praise and five star-reviews by print and electronic media including BBC India, CNN Network 18, Forbes India, Hindustan Times, The Tribune, etc. “Never jingoistic but measured and matter-of-fact, the book makes for thrilling reading with vividly described, moving, cinematic and enthralling scenes” is what Hindustan Times said about the book.

The 2020 Bollywood film, released on Netflix Gunjan Saxena: The Kargil Girl is inspired by her life. Saxena is portrayed by Janhvi Kapoor while the film has been produced by Dharma Productions and Zee Studios. Saxena's's father and brother are played by Pankaj Tripathi and Angad Bedi respectively in other popular roles.

Media inaccuracies
After the film Gunjan Saxena: The Kargil Girl released, there was confusion related to some facts about Saxena. In an article in NDTV she clarifies some of them:

Notes

References 

1975 births
Living people
People from Lucknow
Indian Air Force officers
Indian Air Force personnel
Indian aviators
Indian women aviators
Women air force personnel
Delhi University alumni
Indian women in war